The 2023 Kansas City mayoral election will be held on November 7, 2023, to elect the mayor of Kansas City, Missouri. Incumbent Democratic mayor Quinton Lucas is running for re-election to a second term in office.

Candidates 
 Clay Chastain, transit activist and perennial candidate (Party affiliation: Republican)
 Quinton Lucas, incumbent mayor (Party affiliation: Democratic)

References

Mayoral elections in Kansas City, Missouri
2023 Missouri elections
Kansas City, Missouri